was a Japanese comedian and actor.

Filmography

 Ukare Gitsune Senbon Zakura (1954)
 A Fugitive from the Past (1965)
 Dodes'ka-den (1970)
 Wandering Ginza Butterfly 2: She-Cat Gambler (1972)
 Proof of the Man (1977)

References

External links 
 
 

1908 births
1981 deaths
Actors from Yamagata Prefecture
Japanese comedians
20th-century Japanese male actors
Recipients of the Medal with Purple Ribbon
20th-century comedians